Claude Rilly (born 1960) is a French linguist, Egyptologist, and archaeologist at the CNRS who primarily specializes in Meroitic and Nilo-Saharan languages.

He is also the Director of the French Archaeological Mission in Sedeinga, Sudan.

Linguistics
Rilly proposed the Northern Eastern Sudanic languages in 2010.

References

External links
La langue du royaume de Méroé (in French)

Living people
1960 births
Linguists of Nilo-Saharan languages
Linguists from France
French archaeologists
French Egyptologists
French epigraphers